The Banu Hilal was a confederation of Arabian tribes from the Hejaz and Najd regions of the Arabian Peninsula that emigrated to North Africa in the 11th century. Masters of the vast plateaux of the Najd, they enjoyed a somewhat infamous reputation, possibly owing to their relatively late (for the Arabian tribes) conversion to Islam and accounts of their campaigns in the borderlands between Iraq and Syria. When the Fatimid Caliphate became masters of Egypt and the founders of Cairo in 969, they hastened to confine the unruly Bedouin in the south before sending them to Central North Africa (Libya, Tunisia and Algeria) and then to Morocco.

Origin  

According to Arab genealogists, the Banu Hilal were a sub-tribe of the Mudar tribal confederation, specifically of the Amir ibn Sa'sa'a, and their progenitor was Hilal. According to traditional Arab sources, their full genealogy was the following: Hilāl ibn ʿĀmir ibn Ṣaʿṣaʿa ibn Muʿāwiya ibn Bakr ibn Hawāzin ibn Manṣūr ibn ʿIkrima ibn K̲h̲aṣafa ibn Qays ibn ʿAylān ibn Muḍar ibn Nizār ibn Ma'ad ibn ʿAdnān. The Banu Hilal were very numerous, effectively a nation divided into its own sub-tribes, of which the most notable were the Athbaj, Riyah, Jusham, Zughba, Adi, and Qurra.

Ibn Khaldun described their genealogy, which consisted of two mother tribes: themselves and the Banu Sulaym. In Arabia, they lived on the Ghazwan near Ta'if while the Banu Sulaym attended nearby Medina, sharing a common cousin in the Al Yas branch of the Quraysh. At the time of their migration, Banu Hilal comprised six sub-tribes: Athbadj, Riyah, Jusham, Adi, Zughba, and Rabi'a.

History

Pre-Islamic Arabia 
Its original habitat, like that of its related tribes, was the Najd, and its history during pre-Islamic times is bound with other tribes of BanuʿĀmir ibn Ṣaʿṣaʿa, especially in Ayyām al-ʿArab and in affairs related to the rise of Islam in the region, such as that of Biʾr Māʿūna. Banu Hilal likely did not accept the rule of Islam until after Muhammad's victory at the Battle of Hunayn in 630, but like other Āmirid tribes, they also did not join in the Ridda Wars that followed Muhammad's death in 632.

Migration to Egypt 
The tribe does not appear to have played any significant role in the early Muslim conquests, and for the most part remained in the Nejd. Only in the early 8th century did some of the Hilal (and the Banu Sulaym) move to Egypt. Many followed, so that the two groups became numerous in Egypt. During the Abbasid Caliphate, the Hilal were known for their unruliness.

In the 970s, the Hilal and the Sulaym joined the radical sect of the Qarmatians in their attacks on the Fatimid Caliphate, which had just conquered Egypt and was pushing into Syria. As a result, after his victory over the Qarmatians in 978, the Fatimid caliph al-Aziz forcibly relocated the two tribes to Upper Egypt. As they continued to fight among themselves and pillage the area, they were prohibited from crossing the Nile River or leaving Upper Egypt.

Migration to the Maghreb 
According to Ibn Khaldun, the Banu Hilal were accompanied by their wives and their children when they came to the Maghreb. They settled in Ifriqiya after winning some battles against some Berber tribes, eventually going on to coexist with them.

Abu Zayd al-Hilali led between 150,000 and 300,000 Arabs into the Maghreb, who assimilated and intermarried with the indigenous peoples. The Fatimids used the tribe, which began their journey as allies and vassals, to punish the particularly difficult to control Zirids after the conquest of Egypt and the founding of Cairo. As the dynasty became increasingly independent and abandoned Shia Islam, they quickly defeated the Zirids after the battle of Haydaran and deeply weakened the neighboring Hammadid dynasty and the Zenata. Their influx was a major factor in the linguistic, cultural and ethnic Arabization of the Maghreb and in the spread of nomadism in areas where agriculture had previously been dominant. Ibn Khaldun noted that the lands ravaged by Banu Hilal invaders had become completely arid desert.

Historians estimate the total number of Arab nomads who migrated to the Maghreb in the 11th century to be 250,000 (only the first few decades) to 700,000 to 1,000,000 when the entire population of the Maghreb at the time was 5,000,000.

The Banu Hilal later came under the rule of various subsequent dynasties, including the Almohad Caliphate, Hafsid dynasty, Zayyanid dynasty and Marinid dynasty. Finding their continued presence intolerable, the Almohad Caliphate defeated the Banu Hilal in the Battle of Setif and forced many of them to leave Ifriqiya and settle in Morocco. Upon the arrival of the Turks, the Banu Hilal rose against the Ottoman Empire near the Aurès region and south Algeria. In Morocco during the 17th century, the sultan Ismail Ibn Sharif created a guich army made up of Arab warriors from the Banu Hilal and the Banu Maqil which was one of the main parts of the Moroccan army. They were garrisoned in their own lands of water and pastures and served as troops and military garrisons to fight in wars and suppress rebellions.

Social organization 
Originally, the Banu Hilal embraced a nomadic lifestyle, rearing cattle and sheep. Despite several tribes living in arid and desert areas, they became experts in the field of agriculture. The Banu Hilal embrace the Maliki school of Sunni Islam and are conservative, though the vast majority of the population does embrace Sunni Islam. Initially Shia, after their conquest of the Sunni Maghreb majority of Banu Hilal converted to the Maliki school of Sunni Islam.  Other tribes Arabized the Berbers to a considerable extent in Algeria, where intermarriage occurred frequently during their shared history.

Taghribat Banu Hilal 
The accounts and records that the folk poet Abdul Rahman al-Abnudi gathered from the bards of Upper Egypt culminated in the Taghribat Bani Hilal, an Arab epic describing the journey of the tribe from Arabia to the Maghreb.  The tale is divided into three main cycles. The first two bring together unfolding events in Arabia and other countries of the east, while the third, called Taghriba (march west), recounts the migration of the Banu Hilal to North Africa.

References

Sources
 
 
 
 

Tribes of Arabia
Tribes of Saudi Arabia
Arab tribes in Morocco
Arab tribes in Algeria
Former confederations